It Could Be Any One Of Us is a 1983 play by British playwright Alan Ayckbourn. This play was a murder mystery, but with only subtle changes to the play, there are three possible endings, each naming a different character as the murderer.

References 
 It Could Be Any One Of Us on official Ayckbourn site

Plays by Alan Ayckbourn
1983 plays